Sarcohyla miahuatlanensis, or the Sierra Miahuatlan spikethumb frog, is a species of frog in the family Hylidae. It is endemic to Mexico and only known from its type locality near Candelaria Loxicha on the Sierra de Miahuatlán (part of Sierra Madre del Sur) in Oaxaca.

Taxonomy
It is similar to Sarcohyla cembra and Sarcohyla sabrina.

Description
The holotype, and the only known specimen, is a female that measured  in snout–vent length. The coloration is distinctive: the dorsum is dark green, hidden surfaces are dark brown, flanks are yellow flanks, and canthal mask and lateral reticulations are dark brown. There is a yellow stripe that separates the dorsal from the ventral coloration on the limbs and above the cloaca. The fingers and toes are long and have large ovoid discs; webbing between the fingers is vestigial and slightly more developed between the toes.

Habitat and conservation
Other amphibians found at the locality were salamanders Craugastor mexicanus and Bolitoglossa oaxacensis and frogs of the Exerodonta sumichrasti group.

The area of type locality was covered with relatively intact forest at the time the holotype was collected in 2001. However, many slopes of the Sierra de Miahuatlan have been at least partially cleared for agriculture.

References

miahuatlanensis
Endemic amphibians of Mexico
Fauna of the Sierra Madre del Sur
Amphibians described in 2006
Taxa named by Jonathan A. Campbell
Taxa named by Jesse M. Meik